Eremophila subangustifolia is a flowering plant in the figwort family, Scrophulariaceae and is endemic to the south-west of Western Australia. It is a highly branched shrub which produces a slightly unpleasant odour and has its younger parts densely covered with greyish hairs. The leaves are scattered along the branches and the mostly white flowers are borne singly in leaf axils. It only occurs in a small area near Eneabba and had previously been known as E. microtheca subsp. 'narrow leaves'.

Description
The younger branches are densely covered with greyish hairs but become glabrous with age. The petals are pale lilac to purple on the outside and white inside with fawn-coloured to purple spots. The petal tube and lobes are glabrous except for a few hairs inside the tube. The four stamens are fully enclosed in the petal tube.

This eremophila is very similar to E. microtheca and was previously known as E. microtheca subsp. 'narrow leaves'. (E. microtheca has flatter leaves.)

Taxonomy and naming
Eremophila subangustifolia was first formally described in 2018 by Andrew Brown and Tanya Llorens from a specimen collected near Eneabba and the description was published in Nuytsia. The specific epithet (subangustifolia) is derived from the Latin sub- meaning "somewhat", angustus meaning "narrow" and -folius meaning "leaved" referring to the leaves of this species compared to the similar E. microtheca.

Distribution and habitat
Eremophila subangustifolia grows in slightly salty soils near the edges of winter-wet flats and lakes near Eneabba in the  Kalbarri and Eneabba in the Geraldton Sandplains biogeographic region.

Conservation
Eremophila subangustifolia is classified as "Threatened Flora (Declared Rare Flora — Extant)" by the Western Australian Government Department of Parks and Wildlife.

References

subangustifolia
Eudicots of Western Australia
Endemic flora of Western Australia
Plants described in 2018
Taxa named by Andrew Phillip Brown